The 1991 Los Angeles Dodgers season was the 102nd for the franchise in Major League Baseball, and their 34th season in Los Angeles, California.

The season featured an exciting National League Western Division race between the Dodgers and the Atlanta Braves. The Braves edged out the Dodgers to win the division by one game.  Center fielder Brett Butler set a National League record with 161 errorless games while Darryl Strawberry hit 28 home runs, the most by a left-handed hitter in Los Angeles history at that point. On the debit side, the Dodgers became the first franchise to be on the receiving end of three perfect games when Dennis Martínez prevented any of their batters from reaching base on July 28.

Offseason
 December 13, 1990: Luis Lopez was released by the Dodgers.
 December 14, 1990: José Vizcaíno was traded by the Dodgers to the Chicago Cubs for Greg Smith.
 December 15, 1990: Hubie Brooks was traded by the Dodgers to the New York Mets for Bob Ojeda and Greg Hansell.
 December 20, 1990: Darren Holmes was traded by the Dodgers to the Milwaukee Brewers for Bert Heffernan.
 December 29, 1990: Jim Poole was traded by the Dodgers to the Texas Rangers for David Lynch and Steve Allen.
 January 15, 1991: Kevin Campbell was traded by the Dodgers to the Oakland Athletics for Dave Veres.

Regular season

Season standings

Record vs. opponents

Opening Day starters

Notable transactions
 July 3, 1991: José González was traded by the Dodgers to the Pittsburgh Pirates for Mitch Webster.
 July 31, 1991: Mike Hartley and Braulio Castillo were traded by the Dodgers to the Philadelphia Phillies for Roger McDowell.
 September 6, 1991: Jeff Hartsock was traded by the Dodgers to the Chicago Cubs for Steve Wilson.

Roster

Player stats

Batting

Starters by position
Note: Pos = Position; G = Games played; AB = At bats; H = Hits; Avg. = Batting average; HR = Home runs; RBI = Runs batted in

Other batters
Note: G = Games played; AB = At bats; H = Hits; Avg. = Batting average; HR = Home runs; RBI = Runs batted in

Pitching

Starting pitchers
Note: G = Games pitched; IP = Innings pitched; W = Wins; L = Losses; ERA = Earned run average; SO = Strikeouts

Other pitchers
Note: G = Games pitched; IP = Innings pitched; W = Wins; L = Losses; ERA = Earned run average; SO = Strikeouts

Relief pitchers
Note: G = Games pitched; W = Wins; L = Losses; SV = Saves; ERA = Earned run average; SO = Strikeouts

1991 Awards
1991 Major League Baseball All-Star Game
Brett Butler reserve
Mike Morgan reserve
Eddie Murray reserve
Juan Samuel reserve
Darryl Strawberry reserve
Comeback Player of the Year
Orel Hershiser
NL Player of the Week
Mike Morgan (June 17–23)
Darryl Strawberry (Aug. 19–25)

Farm system

Major League Baseball Draft

The Dodgers selected 93 players in this draft, the largest draft class in history. Of those, six of them would eventually play Major League baseball. The Dodgers lost their first round pick to the New York Mets and their second round pick to the Montreal Expos as a result of their signing free agents Darryl Strawberry and Kevin Gross and gained a third round pick from the Kansas City Royals as compensation for the loss of free agent Kirk Gibson.

The teams first pick (in round three) was outfielder Todd Hollandsworth from Newport High School in Bellevue, Washington. The 1996 NL Rookie of the Year, Hollandsworth played 12 seasons in Major League Baseball (including 6 with the Dodgers) and hit .276 with 98 home runs and 401 RBI.

Notes
The Tampa Bay Rays equalled this record on August 15 of 2012 when Félix Hernández pitched a perfect game for the Seattle Mariners against the Rays. Of the other 28 MLB franchises, only the Minnesota Twins have been on the receiving end of more than one perfect game (in 1968 and 1998).

References

External links 
1991 Los Angeles Dodgers uniform
Los Angeles Dodgers official web site
Baseball-Reference season page
Baseball Almanac season page

Los Angeles Dodgers seasons
Los Angeles Dodgers
Los Angeles Dodgers season